was a Japanese botanist and painter. Born into a samurai family in Fukui, Hirase discovered the spermatozoids of the ginkgo in January 1894, before Seiichiro Ikeno discovered the spermatozoids of the cycad. He is a laureate of the Imperial Prize of the Japan Academy (1912).

Works
Selections regarding Ginkgo biloba:
 1894a. Fecundation period of Ginkgo biloba. (In Japanese) Bot. Mag., Tokyo 8: 7-9.
 1894b. Notes on the attraction-spheres in the pollen-cells of Ginkgo biloba. (In Japanese) Bot. Mag., Tokyo 8: 359-60; 361 -364.
 1895a. Etudes sur le Ginkgo biloba (note pröliminaire). Bot. Mag.,Tokyo 9: 239-240.
 1895b. Etudes sur la föcondation et l´embryogönie du Ginkge biloba (1). J. Coll Sci. imp. Univ. Tokyo 8: 307-3 22.
 1896a. Spermatozoid of Ginkgo biloba. (In Japanese) Bot. Mag., Tokyo 10:171.
 1896b. On the spermatozoid of Ginkgo. (In Japanese) . Bot. Mag., Tokyo 10: 325-328.
 1897. Untersuchungen über das Verhalten des Pollens von Ginkgo biloba. Bot. Zbl. 49: 33-35.
 1898. Etudes sur la fécondation et l´embryogénie du Ginkgo biloba (second mémoire). J. Coll. Sei. imp. Univ. Tokyo 12: 103-149.

References

<https://web.archive.org/web/20100329041151/http://art-random.main.jp/samescale/068-2.html>

19th-century Japanese botanists
1856 births
1925 deaths
20th-century Japanese botanists